Jonathan Church, CBE (born 1967) is a British stage director.

Church was the artistic director of the Birmingham Repertory Theatre (2001–2005) and Chichester Festival Theatre (2006–2016).

In August 2015, Sydney Theatre Company announced that he would be succeeding Andrew Upton as their artistic director.

Career
At Birmingham, he directed the first revival of the David Hare Trilogy (Absence of War, Murmuring Judges and Racing Demon). Productions he has directed at Chichester include The Life and Adventures of Nicholas Nickleby, the first major revival since its RSC premiere in 1980, and The Resistible Rise of Arturo Ui. The Telegraph has credited Church with reviving the fortunes of both the Salisbury Playhouse and the Birmingham Repertory Theatre.

In 2006, Church moved to Chichester, and was praised for saving the Chichester Festival Theatre from closure by almost doubling the audience numbers and overseeing a £22m redevelopment to the theatre.  A number of Chichester productions during his tenure, including Sweeney Todd and South Downs, have subsequently gone on to the West End. Church's production of Singin' in the Rain opened at the Palace Theatre in 2012.

Church and the executive director of CFT, Alan Finch, both announced in March 2015 that they would stand down from their positions, at the end of September 2016, in order to make way for "new ideas and new energies". In June 2015, they were received into the Order of the British Empire as a Commander, for their services to the Festival Theatre.

At the end of 2015, Church replaced Andrew Upton as Artistic Director of the Sydney Theatre Company.

Personal life

Church is the son of Tony Church, former broadcaster with BBC Radio Nottingham and previously chief technician at Nottingham Playhouse, and the actress Marielaine Douglas.

References

External links
 Biography, Chichester Festival Theatre website

1967 births
Living people
British theatre directors
British artistic directors
Commanders of the Order of the British Empire